This is a list of supermarket chains in Oceania.

Australia

Coles Group

Coles Supermarkets
Coles Express
Coles Local

Metcash Trading

IGA
Supa IGA
IGA X-Press/Local Grocer IGA
Foodland IGA
Supa Valu IGA
Eziway Food Stores (Western Australia only)  1 store in Shelley.

Progressive Trading Pty Ltd

Progressive Supa IGA (Western Australia only) consists of: Shoalwater Supa IGA, Girrawheen Supa IGA, Waterford Supa IGA, Vale IGA. Progressive Supa IGA consisted of 15 stores 12 "Progressive Stores" and 3 "Supa IGA Stores" The last Progressive Supa IGA (Spearwood Progressive Supa IGA) closed in February 2019. Leda Supa IGA was demolished in 2018 while High Wycombe Supa IGA was sold to Pham Group IGA. Progressive Supa IGA parent company "Progressive Trading Pty Ltd" is a joint venture between "BMS Bendigo Retail Group Vic" and "Metcash"

Woolworths Group
Woolworths Metro
Woolworths Supermarkets

Supermarkets West Pty Ltd

 Opened its First Farmer Jack's Family Supermarket in 1987. Each of the stores are Independently owned and Operated by local Franchisees. FoodWorks Supermarkets are also locally owned and operated and Supermarkets West use the name under Licence from Australian United Retailers Limited.
 1. Farmer Jack's Family Supermarkets (Western Australia only) 12 stores owned by Fred Fairhorne.
 Farmer Jacks Supermarkets (Western Australia only) 3 Independent stores located in Moora, Forrestfield and Halls Head.
 2. FoodWorks - Used under Licence in (Western Australia only)

Aldi Australia
 German Retailer - stores located in Western Australia, South Australia, Victoria,New South Wales, Queensland.

Costco Wholesale
American Warehouse Style Hypermarket with Food Court.
2 Stores in Located in Western Australia, 
 Perth Airport
 Casuarina

1 Store located in South Australia
 Kilburn

Stores also located in 
 Victoria
 New South Wales
 Queensland

Independent Retailers 
Bernadi's Fresh Format supermarket chain with 5 stores in Central West NSW
 Champions IGA (Victoria only)
Drakes Supermarkets (South Australia and Queensland)
Farmer Jack's Supermarkets (11 location's in WA)
Festival City, food wholesaler (South Australia, only)
Fishers (Victoria and Mount Gambier only)
Foodary, Ampol (Australian petrol stations)
Foodland IGA Supermarkets (South Australia, NT and Broken Hill)
Freshplus
Fresh & Save Australia- Food Warehouses (Queensland, Operated and owned) found only in QLD
Fresh Provisions (Western Australia only)
Friendly Grocer (Australian Capital Territory, New South Wales, Queensland, Victoria and South Australia)
Galati and Sons (Western Australia Only) 1 Store in Fremantle
Gaganis Brothers (South Australia)
Harris Farm Markets (New South Wales, QLD)
India At Home (Melbourne only)
Kaufland Australia rapidly expanding subsidiary of German hypermarket retailer. 15 planned locations in Victoria, Queensland, SA and NSW.
KSM Khurasan Supermarket & Blair Athol IGA, (South Australia)
LaManna Supermarket (Essendon, Victoria)
Macro Wholefoods (New South Wales and Victoria only)
Maloneys Grocer (New South Wales only)
Metropolitan Fresh (South Australia)
Miracle Supermarkets (New South Wales only)
MKS Spices 'N Things Asian supermarket (South Asian, South East Asian and East Asian) (Victoria only)
NQR Owned and operated by Tradeorigins Pty Ltd (Victoria, South Australia and online)
Omega Foods, (South Australia)
Ritchie's (IGA Supermarkets in NSW, Victoria and ACT)
Romeo's (IGA, Foodland and Food Hall Supermarkets in South Australia and NSW only)
Seaton Supreme Foods (South Australia only)
Spudshed (Western Australia only)
Star Mart, Caltex (Australian petrol stations)
Supabarn (Australian Capital Territory and New South Wales)
The Reject Shop (Across Australia,  some grocery goods) 
The Green Grocer (New South Wales only)
Tong Li Asian Supermarket (New South Wales only)
Tony & Marks (South Australia)
Valuemart (Queensland only)
Le Max Group Supermarkets, it operates Leo's Fine Food & Wine, Maxi Food's (Victoria)
Leo's Fine Food & Wine (inner suburban Melbourne only)
Maxi Foods (outer suburban Melbourne and regional Victoria* only)
Australian United Retailers Limited
Foodworks (AURL, Australia)
SPAR Australia Limited (Australian Capital Territory, New South Wales and Queensland)
5 Star (Australian Capital Territory, New South Wales, Northern Territory and Queensland)
DeDe's Discount Supermarket  (Victoria Only)
X Convienance (S.A and W.A.)

Former supermarket chains
 Brisbane Cash & Carry B.C.C (Australia)  Acquired by Woolworths Australia
Bi-Lo Supermarkets (Australia)
Franklin's Supermarkets (Australia)
4 Square Supermarkets (Australia)

Foodland Associated Limited Group
Action Supermarkets (Queensland, Northern NSW, Western Australia only) 49 stores sold to and rebranded as Woolworths, remaining stores rebranded as IGA in 2006.
Action Food Barns
Advantage Supermarkets
Dewsons Supermarkets
Dewsons Express Supermarkets
Supa Valu Supermarkets
Foodland Supermarkets (Western Australia Only) - same name as the stores in South Australia and Northern Territory but not financially related.
Rules Supermarkets
Cheap Foods Supermarkets
BI-Lo Supermarkets (Western Australia only)

Woolworths Limited
Food For Less chain of supermarkets located in the Australian states of New South Wales and Queensland. The last store was at Beresfield, NSW, now re-branded Woolworths
Flemings (New South Wales,1 store was in existence and was located in Jannali, Sydney) This Store Closed in 2020 and moved up the Street and into a Former IGA Store where it trades as Woolworths Metro

Coles Supermarket Group (at various times Coles Myer, Coles Group & Wesfarmers)
Newmart (Western Australia only) Re-branded as Coles in 2003. Some stores sold to FAL and rebranded as Action.
BI-LO was a supermarket chain established in 1979 in South Australia. It was bought by Coles Myer in 1987 and later expanded nationally. Coles started converting stores from late 2006. It withdrew from Victoria in 2009, and from NSW in 2016. The last store, located at Loganholme, Queensland, closed 30 June 2017. Most BI-LO stores were re-branded as Coles.
Crittendens
Pick 'n Pay Hypermarket (Queensland only) consisted of two stores at Aspley and Sunnybank Hills. Pick 'n Pay Hypermarkets were re-branded to other store names within the Wesfarmers Group.

Other former supermarkets
Arrow Supermarkets
AUR - re-branded as FoodWorks in 2003.
Franklins - sold to Metcash in 2010
Franklins Big Fresh (Queensland, New South Wales and Victoria only) - all stores closed or sold off in 2001
Big Save Supermarket (Western Australia only)
BBC Supermarket
Betta Value (Western Australia only) - consisted of one store located at Charthouse  (Waikiki) and was renamed IGA
Bi-Lo Supermarkets (Rebranded as Coles Supermarkets)
Budget Rite Foodmarkets
Buy Rite - taken over by AUR in the 1990s, re-branded as FoodWorks in 2003.
Cannon Supermarkets (ACT?) - taken over by Woolworths Limited, stores re-branded as Woolworths
Charlie Carters (Western Australia only)
 Clancy's (Western Australia only) - re-branded as IGA in 2006.
Dickens Foodmarkets
Giants supermarket (Queensland)
Super Q store (Queensland)
Festival Supermarkets - rebranded as IGA in 2000.
Foodland Supermarkets (Western Australia only) - re-branded as Eziway Food store
Foodland Supermarket (South Australia only) - re-branded Foodland IGA
Food Master
Four Square WA (Western Australia only - re-branded as Eziway in 2004
Fresco Supermarkets (New South Wales only) - all but one store were taken over and rebranded as Franklins in 2002.
Goodfellows
Harry Heaths (Victoria metro Melbourne only) - Heidelberg, Forest Hill, Nunawading, Chirnside Park, Epping Plaza, Balwyn. Became part of SSW
Half Case - became Payless
Jack the Slasher Supermarkets (Queensland, South Australia, New South Wales) - renamed Food For Less in the early 1980s
Jewel Supermarkets - re-branded as IGA in 2000
John Cade "(Western Australia only)" - 21 stores, sold to Tom The Cheap Grocer in 1970s
MityMart
Nancarrows (Victoria only) - Woolworths sold this division to Davids Holdings, many re-branded as Foodtown and Welcome Mart
Payless Supermarkets
Permewans
Rainbow Supermarkets
Rite-Price (South Australia, low discount store's)
Riteway
Rockingham Factory Outlet (Western Australia only) - consisted of one store within the City of Rockingham at United Cinemas complex 
Purity(Tasmania only) - re-branded as Woolworths in 2002
Roelf Vos (Tasmania only) - re-branded as Woolworths in 2002
Safeway Supermarkets - re-branded as Woolworths between 1985 and 2017)
Saveway
Shoeys (New South Wales only) - re-branded as BI-LO in 1987
SSW (mainly in Victoria) - SSW stood for "Self Service Wholesalers", but stores were always branded as SSW.
Stammers Supermarket (Western Australia only) A Family owned supermarket chain consisting of 3 Supermarkets 1. FREMANTLE - Corner of Wray Avenue and Hampton Road - now Ellen's Health Medical Centre 2. PALMYRA - Now trading as WoolWorths Supermarket 2. Winthrop - Now trading as SUPA IGA 
Supa Valu (Western Australia)
Super-Rite
Super K Mart - converted to Coles supermarkets and K-Mart discount department stores in the early 1990s
Top Valu (Western Australia only) - consisted of one store in Maylands and was rebadged as IGA
Tuckerbag (AURL, FoodWorks)

New Zealand

Current
Supermarket retailing in New Zealand is a duopoly:
Woolworths NZ (formerly Progressive Enterprises)
Countdown
FreshChoice
SuperValue
Foodstuffs
Four Square
New World
Pak'n'Save
Pak'n'Save Mini
 Raeward Fresh

Former
Progressive Enterprises
3 Guys - rebranded as Countdown
Big Fresh - rebranded as Woolworths or Countdown
Foodtown - rebranded as Countdown
Price Chopper - rebranded as Woolworths or Countdown
Woolworths - rebranded as Countdown
Write Price - rebranded as Pak'nSave Mini
The Warehouse - shut down their supermarket sections but continues to sell some food items

Papua New Guinea
Waterfront Food World
Boroko Food World
RH Hyper-Mart
Tango
Stop & Shop
JMart
Stop N Shop Supermarket chain belonging to CPL Group who also own chemist and hardware outlets.
TST Supermarkets
San Kam Ap (Stores) 1980s
Burns Philp

See also

References

External links

Oceania
 
 
Lists of companies of New Zealand
Lists of companies of Australia
Companies of Oceania